Cytharomorula pinguis is a species of sea snail, a marine gastropod mollusk in the family Muricidae, the murex snails or rock snails.

Description

Distribution
This marine species was found on the Loyalty Ridge, off the New Hebrides.

References

 Houart R. (1995["1994"]) The Ergalataxinae (Gastropoda, Muricidae) from the New Caledonia region with some comments on the subfamily and the description of thirteen new species from the Indo-West Pacific. Bulletin du Muséum National d'Histoire Naturelle, Paris, ser. 4, 16(A, 2-4): 245-297. 

Gastropods described in 1995
Cytharomorula